Cherono (Alternative: Jerono) is a name of  Kalenjin origin. It indicates that the bearer is a woman and was born near dusk as sheep return from pasture ("Rot Nego"), which is usually between 2 pm and 4 pm. It is closely related to "Kiprotich". Its male equivalent is Kiprono.

Notable people
 Cherono Koech (born 1992), Kenyan middle-distance runner and 2012 Olympian
 Abraham Cherono (born 1980), Kenyan steeplechase and cross country runner
 Gladys Cherono (born 1983), Kenyan long-distance track runner and two-time African champion
 Joyce Cherono Laboso, Kenyan politician and Deputy Speaker of the National Assembly of Kenya
 Lawrence Cherono, Kenyan long-distance runner, Boston Marathon champion
 Mercy Cherono (born 1991), Kenyan long-distance track runner and 2013 World Championships medalist
 Priscah Jepleting Cherono (born 1980), Kenyan long-distance track runner and 2007 World Championships medalist
 Stephen Cherono (born 1982), Kenyan steeplechase runner and two-time world champion, competing for Qatar as Saif Saaeed Shaheen
 Jerono Phylis Rotich, Professor of Kinesiology at North Carolina Central University

See also
 Kiprono, related name meaning "son of Rono"

Kalenjin names